Paul Christopher Chapman (born 28 September 1951) is a Welsh former footballer who played in the Football League for Plymouth Argyle.

Career
Chapman played three times for Plymouth Argyle in the 1969–70 season before deciding to pursue a different career. He became owner of the Astor Hotel and in May 2010 he was ordered by the court to pay his business partner Joseph Louei, £100,000 and branded Chapman as "dishonest".

References

External links

Welsh footballers
English Football League players
Plymouth Argyle F.C. players
1951 births
Living people
Association football defenders